The 5th National Congress of the Lao People's Revolutionary Party (LPRP) was held in Vientiane on 27–29 March 1991. The congress occurs once every five years. A total of 367 delegates represented the party's nearly 60,000 card-carrying members.

References

Congresses of the Lao People's Revolutionary Party
1991 in Laos
1991 conferences